Philip Benedict is an American historian of the Protestant Reformation in Europe, currently holding the title of Professor Emeritus (profeseur honoraire) at the University of Geneva’s Institute for Reformation History (l'Institut d'histoire de la Réformation).

Early life 
Benedict was born in Washington, D.C. on 20 August 1949 to the astrophysicist William S. Benedict and the medical doctor and  print collector Ruth B. Benedict. He has stated that he is agnostic and that his parents raised him in a secular Jewish household, wholly disconnected from the Calvinism in which he would come to specialize. Benedict graduated from Woodrow Wilson High School in Washington DC in 1966.

Training 
Benedict received his B.A. from Cornell University in 1970, where he studied early modern European history with H.G. Koenigsberger. He completed his M.A. in 1972 and his Ph.D. in 1975 at Princeton University, under the direction of Theodore K. Rabb and Lawrence Stone. While conducting his dissertation research in France, Benedict also followed the seminar of  Denis Richet  at what was then the VIe Section of the École Pratique des Hautes Études.

Research 
Benedict’s publications have ranged from economic history to the history of printmaking and information, but have chiefly focused on the social and political history of the Reformation, with primary reference to the French Wars of Religion and the Protestant minority in sixteenth and seventeenth-century France.

Benedict's first book, Rouen during the Wars of Religion, has been described as a "model study of the interaction of social, religious, and political factors in French religious wars" by the American Historical Association Guide to Historical Literature.  His Christ's Churches Purely Reformed: A Social History of Calvinism was awarded the 2003 Philip Schaff Prize from the American Society of Church History, and the 2004 Phyllis Goodhart Gordan Prize from The Renaissance Society of America.

In contrast to Denis Crouzet and Natalie Davis, who have explored the motivations and psychology behind Roman Catholic religious violence in early modern France, Benedict has asserted various motivations and reasons that Huguenots engaged in religious violence against Catholics. Benedict has stated that three important factors inspired French Protestants to wage war against their Catholic adversaries: (1) John Calvin’s condemnation of “Nicodemism,” (2) Reformed polemical treatises and sermons against Catholic images, and (3) the Huguenot belief that the 1562 Edict of January was under direct assault by overzealous Catholics, and thus needed to be defended by force of arms.

Career 
Benedict became a Professor Emeritus (professeur honoraire) at the University of Geneva in 2015. He held the title of professeur ordinaire at the University of Geneva's Institute for Reformation History for nine years prior to his retirement. Benedict served as the Director of the Institute from 2006–2009.

Benedict taught at Brown University for 26 years, where he was the Willard Prescott and Annie McClelland Smith Professor of Religious Studies.

He has held visiting positions or fellowships at Cornell University, the Institute for Advanced Study in Princeton, New Jersey, All Souls College, Oxford, the School for Advanced Studies in the Social Sciences (Paris), the Lumière University Lyon 2, Humboldt University (Berlin), and the National Gallery of Art's Center for Advanced Study in the Visual Arts (Washington, D.C.).

Benedict has published five monographs, one collection of documents, edited (or co-edited) thirty-five edited volumes, and contributed chapters to five edited volumes, nineteen peer-reviewed articles in journals. He has published book reviews in Le Monde, The American Historical Review, Journal of Modern History, The Sixteenth Century Journal, Journal of Interdisciplinary History, Annales: E.S.C., Catholic Historical Review, Social History, Volkskundig Bulletin, Archiv für Reformationsgeschichte Literaturbericht, Journal of Economic History, French History, Journal of Ecclesiastical History, Journal of American History, Bibliothèque d'Humanisme et Renaissance, and The English Historical Review.

Teaching 

Benedict has led the Institut d'histoire de la Réformation's intensive graduate seminars (cours d'été), which attract a wide range of participants to Geneva from institutions across Europe and North America.

Several late medieval and early modern historians have credited him with supervising their dissertations, including Michael Breen, Larissa Taylor, and Liam Brockey. Taylor and Brockey's first books, both of which began as dissertations under Benedict's supervision, have gone on to win major book prizes.

Works

Monographs
 
 
 
 
  Revised and abridged French translation,

Edited and co-edited volumes

Selected chapters in edited volumes

Selected articles
 
  
 
 
 
  Awarded the Nancy Lyman Roelker Prize by the Sixteenth Century Studies Conference.

References

Cornell University alumni
Princeton University alumni
Academic staff of the University of Geneva
1949 births
Living people
Academics from Washington, D.C.
Brown University faculty
Woodrow Wilson High School (Washington, D.C.) alumni
21st-century American historians
21st-century American male writers
American male non-fiction writers